Patrick Nattawat Finkler (born 20 October 2003), also known as Patrick or Yin Haoyu, is a Thai-German actor, singer, dancer, songwriter and model. He played the role of Time in the 2020 Thai television series The Gifted: Graduation. In 2021, he debuted as a member of Chinese boy group INTO1 after finishing ninth in the reality show Produce Camp 2021.

Early life and education
Patrick is of Thai-German mixed ethnicity, the son of Reinhold Bandhard Finkler and Rosrin Finkler. After graduating from kindergarten and grade 1-4 in Germany, he came back to Thailand and spent 3 months to do the equivalence test for 4th grade and successfully enrolled in Semester 2, 4th Grade at Roi Et Kindergarten school English Program in October, 2014. He graduated Grade 7-9 from Roi Et Wittayalai School in Gifted Program. During that time, he was also the vice president of TO BE Number 1 club and a drum major of school Marching band. Patrick, then, studied in high school at Triam Udom Suksa School, majored in Language-Germany, Gifted English program. Only 1 year after he entered high school, he decided to take General Educational Development exam and then take a flight to China to participate in Produce Camp 2021.

Career

2016–2019: Pre-debut 
Patrick was chosen to be one of the actors in the Thai local series, Phu Kaem Non @ 101 (ภูแก้มนนท์ @ 101), but later withdrew from the series due to time conflict from the postponement of filming and his Thai pronunciation.

Patrick won GO ON GIRL&GUY Star Search by Clean & Clear by performing the song "Thinking 'bout you" which was written by himself in the Finals round and as a reward he got an opportunity to sign a contract as an actor of GMMTV.

2020–present: Acting role and debut with INTO1 
Patrick took a role as Time in his first series, The Gifted: Graduation.

Patrick signed a contract as a trainee of Insight Entertainment. He participated in Produce Camp 2021. He finished ninth place in the competition and made his debut in INTO1.

Personal life
Patrick is multilingual: he speaks fluent Thai, German, English and Chinese along with basic Japanese. he also learned to speak some French.

Filmography

Film

Television series

Variety show

Discography

Other Songs

Songwriting Credits

Cover version

Extended plays As a member of INTO1

Singles As a member of INTO1

Stage Performances

Concert fanmeeting and other activities

Ambassadorships and Endorsements
Alongside Patrick's activities with Into1, he has become a brand friend, youth brand ambassador, china youth trend ambassador, brand ambassador and spokesperson for various brands such as BALMAIN, Kiehl's, Piaget, GHD Good Hair Day, Kérastase Paris, 3CE Stylenanda, Atelier Cologne, The Bicester Village Shopping Collection and more. He has also featured on the cover of many magazines such as Men's Health, Men's Uno Young, WAVES漫潮, OK! 精彩 and more

Events

Magazine

Awards and nominations

Individual

Group

Notes

References

External links 
 
 
 
 

Nattawat Finkler
Nattawat Finkler
Nattawat Finkler
2003 births
Living people
People from Saarland
Musicians from Saarland
Nattawat Finkler
Produce 101 (Chinese TV series) contestants
Into1 members
Reality show winners